Andy Wells (born September 2, 1954) is an American real estate developer and politician who served in the North Carolina House of Representatives from the 96th district from 2013 to 2015, and in the North Carolina Senate from the 42nd district from 2015 to 2020.

In 2020, Wells ran for Lieutenant Governor of North Carolina. He placed second in the March primary election, losing to eventual general election winner Mark Robinson. In June 2020, Wells resigned his seat in the North Carolina Senate to make himself "available for some other projects".

Electoral history

2020

2018

2016

2014

2012

References

|-

1954 births
Living people
Democratic Party members of the North Carolina House of Representatives
Democratic Party North Carolina state senators